The 82nd Infantry Division''' (82-ya Pekhotnaya Diviziya'') was an infantry formation of the Russian Imperial Army.

Organization
1st Brigade
325th Infantry Regiment
326th Infantry Regiment
2nd Brigade
327th Infantry Regiment
328th Infantry Regiment

References

Infantry divisions of the Russian Empire